Margaret McCrorie Herbison  (11 March 1907 – 29 December 1996) was a Scottish Labour politician who was Minister of Social Security from 1964 to 1967.

Early life 
Herbison was born on 11 March 1907 in Shotts, Lanarkshire to Maria Jane McCrorie and John Herbison, a coal miner. She was schooled at Dykehead primary school and Bellshill Academy. She attended the University of Glasgow graduating with an MA in English in 1928. While at university she chaired its Labour Party branch. From 1930 to 1945 Herbison worked as a teacher of English and history at Maryhill primary school and Alan Glen's secondary school, both in Glasgow. She also worked as an economics tutor at the National Council of Labour Colleges, and served on the Miners' Welfare Commission. During this time she was active in local Labour politics.

Political career 
After the death of her father in the coalmine in which he worked, his miners' lodge nominated her as a candidate for the North Lanarkshire constituency. She won the nomination, and subsequently took the seat at the General Election of 1945 from the Conservative Sir William Anstruther Grey.

In government, she held office as Joint Parliamentary Under-Secretary of State for Scotland from 1950 to 1951, as Minister of Pensions and National Insurance from 1964 to 1966, and as Minister of Social Security from 1966 to 1967. She was opposition spokesperson on Scotland (1951–1956, 1959–1962), Education (1956–1959), and Pensions (1958–1959 and 1962–1964).

She was a Member of Labour National Executive Committee, and Labour Party Chairman in 1957. In the House of Commons, she was Chairman of Select Committee on Overseas Aid in 1969–70. She was a British delegate to the Council of Europe, and is believed to be the only woman - among 101 members - to attend the very first sitting of the Council's Parliamentary Assembly in Strasbourg in August 1949.

Personal life 
A lifelong member of the Church of Scotland, from 1970 to 1971 she became the first woman to serve as Lord High Commissioner to the General Assembly of the Church of Scotland.

In 1970 the University of Glasgow awarded her an honorary degree.

In 1970 she was named 'Scotswoman of the Year'.

She died of cancer on 29 December 1996 at St Mary's Hospital, Lanark.

References

External links 
 
Parliamentary Archives, Papers of Margaret Herbison MP

1907 births
1996 deaths
People from Shotts
Alumni of the University of Glasgow
Female members of the Parliament of the United Kingdom for Scottish constituencies
Scottish Labour MPs
Members of the Privy Council of the United Kingdom
Members of the Parliament of the United Kingdom for Scottish constituencies
UK MPs 1945–1950
UK MPs 1950–1951
UK MPs 1951–1955
UK MPs 1955–1959
UK MPs 1959–1964
UK MPs 1964–1966
UK MPs 1966–1970
Lords High Commissioner to the General Assembly of the Church of Scotland
Chairs of the Labour Party (UK)
20th-century Scottish women politicians
20th-century Scottish politicians
Deaths from cancer in Scotland
Ministers in the Attlee governments, 1945–1951
Ministers in the Wilson governments, 1964–1970
People educated at Bellshill Academy
Politicians from North Lanarkshire